William ("Gulielmo") Jameson (1796–1873) was a Scottish-Ecuadorian botanist. He was born in Edinburgh and studied at the Royal College of Surgeons of Edinburgh. He made several voyages as a ship's surgeon, first to Baffin Bay, then to South America. In 1826 he settled in Quito, Ecuador. He was then appointed professor of chemistry and botany at Universidad Central del Ecuador. He went back to Edinburgh in 1869, returned to Quito in 1872, and died shortly thereafter.

Jameson made botanical investigations and collections in Greenland, Ecuador and in other South American countries. He began writing a flora of Ecuador, Synopsis Plantarum Aequatoriensium, of which Volumes 1 and 2 were published in 1865. The work was not completed.

Jameson is commemorated in the name of the Andean snipe, Gallinago jamesoni, and a species of Buddleja bush found in Ecuador, Buddleja jamesonii.

References

External links
Biography at the Archives of the Gray Herbarium Library

Scottish botanists
Botanists active in the Arctic
Botanists active in South America
1796 births
1873 deaths
Scottish emigrants to Ecuador